James Dennis Hunter (born 1959) is an American sports announcer, most recently with the Baltimore Orioles of Major League Baseball. His 24-year tenure with the team began in 1997. Hunter announced that the Orioles were not renewing his contract via Twitter on January 22, 2021.

Biography
Hunter was with CBS Radio Sports from 1982 to 1996. While with CBS Radio he called the baseball  'Game of the Week' from 1986 to the end of his tenure there, as well as numerous postseason series. He was also a studio announcer for CBS Radio during the 1992 and 1994 Olympic Winter Games. He is the host of O's Extra as well as calling select play-by-play games and is a former lead voice of the Orioles. He called MASN's coverage of college football and basketball.

Hunter graduated from St. John Vianney High School in Holmdel Township, New Jersey in 1977, and was inducted into the school's athletic Hall of Fame in 1994. He graduated from Seton Hall University in 1982 and was active in the school's radio station, WSOU. Hunter also attended Brookdale Community College.

Hunter lives in Fallston, Maryland, with his wife Bonnie; they have three children.

References

External links

Jim Hunter's bio at the Orioles official website 

Seton Hall University alumni
Brookdale Jersey Blues baseball players
Baltimore Orioles announcers
Baltimore Ravens announcers
Major League Baseball broadcasters
American radio sports announcers
American television sports announcers
Living people
National Football League announcers
College football announcers
College basketball announcers in the United States
Olympic Games broadcasters
Mid-Atlantic Sports Network
Brookdale Community College alumni
People from Fallston, Maryland
St. John Vianney High School (New Jersey) alumni
1959 births